Singjor  is a village in Chanditala I community development block of Srirampore subdivision in Hooghly district in the Indian state of West Bengal.

Geography

Gram panchayat
Villages and census towns in Bhagabatipur gram panchayat are: Bhadua, Bhagabatipur, Jalamadul, Kanaidanga, Metekhal and Singjor.

Demographics
As per 2011 Census of India, Singjor had a total population of 1,589 of which 848 (53%) were males and 741 (47%) were females. Population below 6 years was 208. The total number of literates in Singhjor was 1,219 (88.27% of the population over 6 years).

References 

Villages in Chanditala I CD Block